Gunjala Gondi is a Unicode block containing characters of Gunjala Gondi script used for writing the Adilabad dialect of the Gondi language.

Block

History
The following Unicode-related documents record the purpose and process of defining specific characters in the Gunjala Gondi block:

References 

Unicode blocks